Thermal engineering is a specialized sub-discipline of mechanical engineering that deals with the movement of heat energy and transfer. The energy can be transferred between two mediums or transformed into other forms of energy. A thermal engineer will have knowledge of thermodynamics and the process to convert generated energy from thermal sources into chemical, mechanical, or electrical energy.  Many process plants use a wide variety of machines that utilize components that use heat transfer in some way. Many plants use heat exchangers in their operations. A thermal engineer must allow the proper amount of energy to be transferred for correct use. Too much and the components could fail, too little and the system will not function at all.  Thermal engineers must have an understanding of economics and the components that they will be servicing or interacting with. Some components that a thermal engineer could work with include heat exchangers, heat sinks, bi-metals strips, radiators and many more. Some systems that require a thermal engineer include; Boilers, heat pumps, water pumps, engines, and more.

Part of being a thermal engineer is to improve a current system and make it more efficient than the current system. Many industries employ thermal engineers, some main ones are the automotive manufacturing industry, commercial construction, and Heating Ventilation and Cooling industry. Job opportunities for a thermal engineer are very broad and promising.

Thermal engineering may be practiced by mechanical engineers and chemical engineers.
One or more of the following disciplines may be involved in solving a particular thermal engineering problem: Thermodynamics, Fluid mechanics, Heat transfer, or
Mass transfer.
One branch of knowledge used frequently in thermal engineering is that of thermofluids.

Applications
Boiler design
Combustion engines
Cooling systems
Cooling of computer chips
Heat exchangers
HVAC
Process Fired Heaters
Refrigeration Systems
Compressed Air Systems
Solar heating
Thermal insulation
Thermal power plants

References

External links
NASA.gov Thermal Engineering branch at Goddard Space Flight Center]
List of related fields in UNESCO thesaurus

Mechanical engineering
Chemical engineering